Battle of Baiji may refer to:

Battle of Baiji (October–December 2014), in which ISIL captured the city of Baiji, Iraq
Battle of Baiji (2014–15), in which the Iraqi Army and allied Shi'ite militias captured Baiji and the surrounding region